Erhard Riedrich (born March 19, 1942) is an East German sprint canoer who competed in the late 1960s. He finished sixth in the K-4 1000 m event at the 1968 Summer Olympics in Mexico City.
He won the East German National k1-500 meters title in 1966. And the following year, he won in K2 over the same distance.

References
Sports-reference.com profile

1942 births
Canoeists at the 1968 Summer Olympics
German male canoeists
Living people
Olympic canoeists of East Germany